Zachary Lane Bryan (born April 2, 1996) is an American singer-songwriter from Oologah, Oklahoma. A U.S. Navy veteran, his major-label debut album American Heartbreak entered the U.S. Billboard 200 at number five.

Early life
Bryan was born in Okinawa, Japan while his family was deployed in the Navy overseas, but grew up in Oologah, Oklahoma. He is the son of Dewayne Bryan and Annette DeAnn (Mullen) Bryan, and has a sister, Mackenzie. Continuing a family tradition, Bryan was an active-duty member of the U.S. Navy, enlisting at the age of 17. He had started writing songs at the age of 14 and used his spare time whilst in the Navy to write music for his enjoyment.

Musical career
Bryan started uploading his music to YouTube in 2017, with his friends recording him performing using his iPhone. One of his songs, "Heading South", eventually went viral.

His debut album, DeAnn, was dedicated to his late mother and released on August 24, 2019. It was written in two months and recorded with his friends in a Florida Airbnb. A second album, Elisabeth, was released on May 8, 2020. He recorded the album in a repurposed barn behind his home in Washington.

On April 10, 2021, Bryan made his Grand Ole Opry debut. He later signed a deal with Warner Records to release his music.

On October 14, 2021, Bryan announced that the U.S. Navy honorably discharged him after eight years of service to pursue his career in music just ahead of his nationwide Fall 2021 "Ain't For Tamin' Tour". He said, "If it was my decision, I would never get out of the world's greatest Navy, but here I am and they kindly honorably discharged me to go play some music."

On January 25, 2022, Bryan announced that he would release his major-label debut, a triple album, American Heartbreak, on May 20, 2022. It debuted at number five on the US Billboard 200 with over 70,000 album-equivalent units, marking the biggest first week for a country album in 2022.

On October 11, 2022, Bryan released the single "Starved", followed by the two singles "Fifth of May" and "The Greatest Day of My Life".

On Christmas Day of 2022, he released a live album called All My Homies Hate Ticketmaster recorded at Red Rocks Amphitheatre.

Discography

Studio albums

Live albums

Extended plays

Singles

Other charted songs

Notes

References

External links 
 

21st-century American guitarists
21st-century American male singers
21st-century American singers
American country singer-songwriters
American male guitarists
American male singer-songwriters
Country musicians from Oklahoma
Guitarists from Oklahoma
Living people
Singer-songwriters from Oklahoma
United States Navy sailors
Warner Records artists
1996 births